Dikgatlong Local Municipality is an administrative area in the Frances Baard District of the Northern Cape in South Africa. Dikgatlong is a Setswana name meaning "confluence", and refers to the place where the Harts and Vaal rivers flow into each other in Delportshoop. The name was used as early as 1700.

Main places
The 2011 census divided the municipality into the following main places:

Politics 

The municipal council consists of fifteen members elected by mixed-member proportional representation. Eight councillors are elected by first-past-the-post voting in eight wards, while the remaining seven are chosen from party lists so that the total number of party representatives is proportional to the number of votes received. In the election of 1 November 2021 the African National Congress (ANC) won a majority of eight seats on the council.

The following table shows the results of the election.

References

Local municipalities of the Frances Baard District Municipality